The toadhopper (Buforania crassa) is a spur-throated grasshopper of the Northern Territory, Australia.

References 

Acrididae
Orthoptera of Australia
Insects described in 1920